Hurst Publishers (C. Hurst & Co Publishers Ltd) is an independent non-fiction publisher based in the Bloomsbury area of London. Hurst specializes in books on global affairs and has lists in Islamic Studies, European History, War & Conflict, African Studies and International Relations. Christopher Hurst founded the company in 1969. Michael Dwyer, who joined Hurst in 1986, took over its running after the death of Christopher Hurst in April 2007.

Hurst authors include the French intellectual Olivier Roy, the British cultural critic Ziauddin Sardar, the Australian counterinsurgency expert David Kilcullen, and the historians Faisal Devji and Christopher Davidson, among others. The Hurst imprint publishes approximately 65 new books a year.

History

Christopher Hurst (1929–2007) founded the publishing house and pursued his, sometimes eclectic, interests, including Scandinavian culture and Balkan history. In the mid-1980s, he became an activist for small, independent publishers, making his voice heard in the Publishers' Association.

Hurst Publishers works in collaboration with Oxford University Press in New York to publish most of its list as Oxford University Press editions in North America.

Publishing list

Authors

 Nnamdi Azikiwe
 Olivier van Beemen 
 Brian Maurice Bennett
 Mia Bloom
 Sarmila Bose
 Ian Campbell
 Efua Dorkenoo
 Jean-Pierre Filiu
 Stephen Grey
 Christophe Jaffrelot
 Dan Kaszeta
 Neil Kent 
 Bob Lambert
 Paul Lendvai
 Maleeha Lodhi
 Peter Mandaville
 Raphael Minder
 Kajsa Norman 
 David Omand
 Jason Pack
 Lipika Pelham 
 Gerard Prunier
 Carne Ross
 Abdul Salam Zaeef
 William Ralston
 William Ralston Shedden-Ralston

References

External links 
Official Hurst Publishers website
Hurst Publishers' blog
Oxford University Press USA
Facebook page: Hurst Publishers 

Political book publishing companies
Book publishing companies based in London
British companies established in 1969
Publishing companies established in 1969
1969 establishments in England